Indian Ocean campaign may refer to:
Ottoman naval expeditions in the Indian Ocean (1538–54)
Linois's expedition to the Indian Ocean (1803–6)
Mauritius campaign of 1809–1811
Andaman Islands Expedition (1867)
Indian Ocean in World War II
Indian Ocean raid (1942)
Indian Ocean raid (1944)